Retalhos da Vida de Um Médico is a 1962 Portuguese drama film directed by Jorge Brum do Canto. It was entered into the 13th Berlin International Film Festival.

The film is based on the book of the same name written by Fernando Namora. It contains several separate stories, each from the life of a physician and told as first-person narrative from the memory of the central character, drawing a realistic picture of the life of a physician with the use of many adjectives.

Cast 
 Jorge Sousa Costa - Doctor
 João Guedes - Dr. Valenca
 Emilio Correia - Pharmacist
 Irene Cruz - Luisa
 Costa Ferreira
 Ruy Furtado
 Maria Olguim
 Leónia Mendes
 Manuela Bonito
 Rudolfo Neves
 Ivone de Moura
 Mário Sargedas
 António Machado
 Emídio Ribeiro Pratas

References

External links 
 

1961 books
1962 films
1960s Portuguese-language films
1962 drama films
Portuguese literature
Portuguese black-and-white films
Films directed by Jorge Brum do Canto
Portuguese drama films